Dusatlat (also Romanized as Dūsatlāt; also known as Doselāt, Dūzārāt, and Dūzelāt) is a village in Khara Rud Rural District, in the Central District of Siahkal County, Gilan Province, Iran. At the 2006 census, its population was 547, in 140 families.

References 

Populated places in Siahkal County